Ferdows Rural District is in the Central District of Shahriar County, Tehran province, Iran. At the National Census of 2006, its population was 15,225 in 3,848 households. There were 8,041 inhabitants in 2,279 households at the following census of 2011. At the most recent census of 2016, the population of the rural district was 12,003 in 3,724 households. The largest of its seven villages was Yusefabad-e Seyrafi, with 5,308 people.

References 

Shahriar County

Rural Districts of Tehran Province

Populated places in Tehran Province

Populated places in Shahriar County